Reuben Bell (c. 1945 – 2004) was an American soul singer who recorded from the late 1960s to the early 1980s, and is best known for his emotional tenor vocals on the songs "It's Not That Easy" and "I Hear You Knocking (It's Too Late)".

Born in Shreveport, Louisiana, he began singing in local clubs.  He first recorded, with backing group The Casanovas, on the single "It's Not That Easy", released on the local Murco label in 1967.  The recording has subsequently become regarded as a classic of Southern soul and has featured on several compilation albums.  Two later records followed for Murco, "You're Gonna Miss Me" with The Beltones, and "Action Speaks Louder Than Words", before Bell moved to the Silver Fox and House of Orange labels where some of his recordings were produced by Wardell Quezergue.  He also wrote songs recorded by Bobby "Blue" Bland and others.

In 1972, he recorded Tarheel Slim's song, "I Hear You Knocking (It's Too Late)", for the DeLuxe label, a subsidiary of King Records.  It became Bell's only chart hit, reaching # 38 on the Billboard R&B chart.  He continued to record through the 1970s for the Alarm label, and released his only album, Blues Get Off My Shoulder, for the Port City label in 1982.

Bell died in 2004 while living in Shreveport's Cedar Grove neighborhood.

References

External links
Article including 2002 interview
Discography
Story with information on Bell's House of Orange and Port City Records

American soul musicians
1945 births
2004 deaths
20th-century American musicians